George N. Martin (August 15, 1929 – June 1, 2010) was an American television, stage, and movie actor who is known for his role as the hotel receptionist in Léon: The Professional. A regular at Providence's Trinity Repertory Company, he was nominated for a Tony Award in 1983 for his role in David Hare's Plenty.

Filmography

References

External links
 
 
 

1929 births
2010 deaths
American male film actors
American male television actors
American male stage actors
Male actors from New York City